Samuele Pizza (born 5 September 1988) is an Italian former professional footballer who played as a midfielder.

Club career
Born in Viareggio, Pizza finished his youth formation with Empoli, and after a loan stint at Monza he joined Esperia Viareggio.

On 29 January 2014 Pizza was loaned to Serie B side Avellino until June. On 8 February he made his division debut, coming on as a late substitute in a 1–1 draw at Ternana.

References

External links

FIGC international stats  

1988 births
Living people
People from Viareggio
Association football midfielders
Italian footballers
Serie B players
Serie C players
Empoli F.C. players
A.C. Monza players
F.C. Esperia Viareggio players
U.S. Avellino 1912 players
Italy youth international footballers
Sportspeople from the Province of Lucca
Footballers from Tuscany